Coast Guard Air Station New Orleans is a United States Coast Guard Air Station located at Naval Air Station Joint Reserve Base New Orleans in Belle Chasse, Louisiana.

Operations and missions 
Coast Guard Air Station (CGAS) New Orleans support a multitude of Coast Guard missions worldwide. 
Air Station New Orleans provides Search & Rescue (SAR) coverage with MH-60T Jayhawk helicopters 24 hours a day, 365 days a year, for 655 nautical miles of shoreline from Apalachicola, Florida to the eastern border of Texas, and 735 nautical miles of the Mississippi River from the mouth of the river to Memphis, Tennessee, averaging more than 320 SAR cases a year. Other missions include: Marine Safety, Marine Environmental Protection, Protection of Natural Resources, Aids to Navigation support, Migrant Interdiction, Drug Interdiction, and Defense Readiness. Many of these missions require deployment of Aviation Detachments (AVDETs) about Coast Guard Cutters.

External links 
 Coast Guard Air Station New Orleans official site

United States Coast Guard Air Stations
Military in New Orleans

de:Coast Guard Air Station